Jieut (character: ㅈ) is a consonant of the Korean alphabet. The Unicode for ㅈ is U+3148. The IPA pronunciation is voiceless [tʃ] at the beginning of a word and voiced [dʒ] after vowels. It becomes [t] at the end of a syllable, unless a vowel follows it.

Stroke order

References 

Hangul jamo